RTL 4 (Radio Télévision Luxembourg 4) is a Dutch free-to-cable television channel; it is the most-watched commercial station in the country, popular especially with those aged between 20 and 49. RTL 4 is a general entertainment channel with infotainment, television drama, talk shows, game shows, news and talent shows. It is owned by RTL Nederland, a subsidiary of RTL Group. The station has three sister TV channels: RTL 5, RTL 7 and RTL 8, and four thematic TV channels: RTL Z, RTL Lounge, RTL Crime and RTL Telekids.

Officially RTL 4 - along with RTL 5, RTL 7 and RTL 8 - is headquartered in Hilversum, broadcasting under a Luxembourg TV license. This allows them to avoid more strict control by the Dutch media authorities as Luxembourg's television watchdog is less strict. Despite being intended for Dutch audiences, RTL 4 is encrypted on the Dutch DVB-T Digitenne platform but free-to-air in Luxembourg.

History
It originally launched on the Astra 1A satellite as RTL Véronique on 2 October 1989, before re-branding as RTL 4 the next year. 1, 2 and 3 were already used by the Netherlands' public broadcasters. It was one of the first private commercial broadcaster in the Netherlands. Officially, it still broadcasts from Luxembourg. Private broadcasters were not allowed in the Netherlands until 1992. The encryption system employed by both RTL 4 and 5 analogue services whilst on the Astra 1A and 1C satellites was Luxcrypt. This standard was employed in order to protect the distribution rights sold by foreign studios to RTL.

RTL 4 broadcasts the first and the longest running soap of the Netherlands, Goede Tijden, Slechte Tijden (since 1 October 1990).

RTL 4's latest radical change of programming was on 18 August 2007 when RTL obtained the soccer rights (Eredivisie) but lost the rights to the NOS the following year. In 2008 RTL 4 went back to its roots as a family entertainment channel with programmes such as Idols, X Factor, Dancing with the Stars and Dancing on Ice. That year RTL 4 also launched Ik Hou Van Holland, a quiz-show around and about the Netherlands with Linda De Mol.

From 2009 the talent shows are playing a major role in the programming of RTL 4, the X-Factor has been rescheduled successfully to Friday night with higher ratings in Season 2 (2009) and Season 3 (2010) on Fridays. In 2010, RTL 4 bought the rights for broadcasting Holland's Got Talent from SBS 6 and created together with pioneer John De Mol their own talent show The Voice of Holland in the Autumn of that same year. The Voice of Holland became a huge hit on Dutch Television with ratings around 3 million viewers every Friday Night. In 2012 yet another new talent show started, Beat the Best.

RTL 4 also owns the rights for the soaps As the World Turns and The Bold and the Beautiful. In January 2007, RTL sold the rights for B&B to SBS6, but bought the rights back in December 2010. With more money and space to buy other TV shows, RTL 4 bought the rights for the first season of the successful drama show Brothers & Sisters and took over CSI: Miami from sister channel RTL 5.

Television host Peter van der Vorst has been appointed Content and Marketing Director of RTL Nederland. He will start on 1 March 2019.

Radio
From May 1991 until September 2006, the station has had several accompanying radio stations, such as RTL 4 Radio, RTL Radio, RTL Rock Radio, Happy RTL, and RTL FM. Between June 2007 and 1 January 2012 RTL Nederland owned Radio 538, one of the largest radio stations of the Netherlands.

Programming
Hits on RTL 4 include the RTL Nieuws, Editie NL, RTL Boulevard, Goede Tijden, Slechte Tijden and the Saturday night family show Ik hou van Holland. Talent shows are also very popular on RTL 4, such as Idols, X Factor, Holland's Got Talent, Supernanny and The Voice of Holland. RTL 4 also owns the rights for American TV series.

As is the practice with other television and film services nationwide, programmes in another language as well as portions of local programmes with foreign language dialogue are carried with Dutch subtitles in lieu of dubbing.

Domestic

Children's Shows
De Club van Sinterklaas
Telekids

Comedy
Gooische Vrouwen
Voetbalvrouwen (Footballers' Wives)

Drama
Baantjer
Moordvrouw
Peter R. de Vries: Crime Reporter

Game Shows
BankGiro Miljonairs (Who Wants to Be a Millionaire?)
Eén tegen 100
I Can See Your Voice (Dutch version of the South Korean program of the same name)
Vijf tegen Vijf (Family Feud)
De Zwakste Schakel (The Weakest Link)
The Big Music Quiz (Dutch version of Le Grand Blind test)
Dit was het nieuws (Dutch version of Have I Got News for You)
Ik hou van Holland
De Jongens tegen de Meisjes
Het Moment Van De Waarheid

News
RTL Nieuws

Reality
Bouwval gezocht (Property Ladder)
Dancing on Ice
Dancing with the Stars (British version of Strictly Come Dancing)
Eigen Huis & Tuin
Holland's Got Talent
The Voice of Holland
The Voice Kids
The Voice Senior
Hoe schoon is jouw Huis? (How Clean Is Your House?)
Idols (revived on RTL 5 for the fifth series)
Mijn Tent is Top (My Restaurant Rules) (series 2 & 3)
My Name Is...
Soundmixshow
X Factor

Soap Operas
Goede tijden, slechte tijden

Talk Shows
RTL Boulevard
BEAU
Jinek
Humberto

Imported
The Bold and the Beautiful
Dr. Phil
ER

Notable television presenters
 Vivienne van den Assem (2018–present)
 Vivian Boelen (1991–2012)
 Carlo Boszhard (1993–present)
 Patty Brard (1989-1990, 1994, 2011-2013, 2018)
 Robert ten Brink (2006–present)
 Daphne Bunskoek (2005-2008, 2013, 2018–present)
 Pepijn Crone (2015–present)
 Nicolette van Dam (2008–2015)
 Wendy van Dijk (2006–2019)
 Marieke Elsinga (2016–present)
 Beau van Erven Dorens (1998-2005, 2007-2009, 2015-present)
 Natasja Froger (2010–present)
 Gordon (2007–2018)
 Angela Groothuizen (2009–present)
 Olcay Gulsen (2016-2019)
 John van den Heuvel (2001–present)
 Jan de Hoop (1989–present)
 Mariska Hulscher (200?-200?)
 Twan Huys (2018-2019)
 Luuk Ikink (2013–present)
 Chantal Janzen (2005-2006, 2011–present)
 Eva Jinek (2020–present)
 Nicolette Kluijver (2014–present)
 Jeroen van Koningsbrugge (2008-2019)
 Martijn Krabbé (1995–present)
 Pernille La Lau (2006-2008, 2010–present)
 Paul de Leeuw (2013-2014, 2018–present)
 Marc van der Linden (2003–present)
 Bridget Maasland (2007-2012, 2016–present)
 Char Margolis (2002–2008, 2010)
 Jaap van Meekren (1989–1993)
 Linda de Mol (2007–2019)
 Irene Moors (1989–2016)
 Ruben Nicolai (2015–present)
 Derek Ogilvie (2007–2013)
 Jeroen Pauw (1989–2000)
 Antoin Peeters (2002–present)
 Jur Raatjes (1989–1999)
 Art Rooijakkers (2018–present)
 Loretta Schrijver (1989-2007, 2010–present)
 Katja Schuurman (2018–present)
 Gaston Starreveld (1990–present)
 Humberto Tan (2007-2012, 2013–present)
 Caroline Tensen (1989-1999, 2019–present)
 Quinty Trustfull (2006, 2008–present)
 Rudolph van Veen (2000–2005, 2008–2011)
 Thomas Verhoef (2005–present)
 Peter van der Vorst (2006-2019)
 Peter R. de Vries (1995–1998, 2006–2010, 2013–2021)
 Frits Wester (1994–present)
 Merel Westrik (2014–2019)
 John Williams (1995–present)

Teletext
RTL 4 offered a teletext service which stopped on 1 April 2017. The pages 888/889 are still available for subtitles.

References

External links
RTL 4 

Television channels in the Netherlands
RTL Nederland
1989 establishments in the Netherlands
Television channels and stations established in 1989